Corrective maintenance is a maintenance task performed to identify, isolate, and rectify a fault so that the failed equipment, machine, or system can be restored to an operational condition within the tolerances or limits established for in-service operations.

Definition 
A French official standard defines "corrective maintenance" as maintenance which is carried out after failure detection and is aimed at restoring an asset to a condition in which it can perform its intended function (NF EN 13306 X 60-319 standard, June 2010).

Corrective maintenance can be subdivided into "immediate corrective maintenance" (in which work starts immediately after a failure) and "deferred corrective maintenance" (in which work is delayed in conformance to a given set of maintenance rules).

Standards 
The technical standards concerning corrective maintenance are set by IEC 60050 chapter 191 °Dependability and quality of service"

The NF EN 13306 X 60-319 is a subset of IEC 60050-191.

Choice 
The decision to choose corrective maintenance as a method of maintenance is a decision depending on several factors as  the cost of downtime, reliability characteristics and redundancy of assets.

Methods 
The steps of corrective maintenance are, following failure, diagnosis – elimination of the part, causing the failure – ordering the replacement – replacement of the part – test of function and finally the continuation of use.

The basic form of corrective maintenance is a step-by-step procedure.  The object's failure triggers the steps.
Modern technologies as the use of Industry 4.0 features reduce the inherent drawbacks of corrective maintenance. by e.g. providing device history, fault patterns, repair advice or availability of spare parts.

See also 
 Preventive maintenance
 Predictive maintenance

Bibliography 
 L.C. Morow: Maintenance Engineering Hand Book, Mc Graw Hill, New York, 1952
 S. Nakajima: Introduction to TPM, Productivity Press, Cambridge, Massachusetts, 1988
 Peter Willmott: Total Production Maintenance the Western Way, Butterworth, Heinemann, First Published 1994, Oxford, London

References

Maintenance